The Revolutionary Liberation Army of Azawad (abbreviated ARLA) is a Tuareg militant rebel group in northern Mali. The ARLA surged as a dissident group opposing the Tamanrasset Accords. In December 1991, the ARLA joined the United Movements and Fronts of Azawad (MFUA), which signed the National Pact peace treaty.

See also
Tuareg Rebellion (1990–1995)

References

Conflicts in 1991
Rebel groups in Mali
Tuareg rebels
Azawad